Pengzhou (彭州) is a city in Sichuan, China.

Pengzhou or Peng Prefecture may refer to:

Pengzhou (彭州), a former prefecture in modern Qingyang, Gansu, China
Pengzhou (彭州), a former prefecture in roughly modern Barkam County, Sichuan, China
Pengzhou (蓬州), a former prefecture in roughly modern Peng'an County, Sichuan, China
Pengzhou (蓬州), a former prefecture in roughly modern Hanyuan County, Sichuan, China